Diffuse optical imaging (DOI) is a method of imaging using near-infrared spectroscopy (NIRS) or fluorescence-based methods. 
When used to create 3D volumetric models of the imaged material DOI is referred to as diffuse optical tomography, whereas 2D imaging methods are classified as diffuse optical imaging.

The technique has many applications to neuroscience, sports medicine, wound monitoring, and cancer detection. Typically DOI techniques monitor changes in concentrations of oxygenated and deoxygenated hemoglobin and may additionally measure redox states of cytochromes. The technique may also be referred to as diffuse optical tomography (DOT), near infrared optical tomography (NIROT) or fluorescence diffuse optical tomography (FDOT), depending on the usage.

In neuroscience, functional measurements made using NIR wavelengths, DOI techniques may classify as functional near infrared spectroscopy fNIRS.

Physical mechanism 
Biological tissues can be considered strongly diffusive media, since during light propagation the scattering phenomenon is dominant over absorption in the so-called "therapeutic window" spectral range. Photon migration in diffusive media is described by the heuristic model of the diffusion equation, which offers analytical solutions for some specific geometries. Starting from the measured absorption and scattering coefficients, it is possible to derive the concentrations of tissues' main chromophores.

Diffuse optical imaging can be implemented in time domain, frequency domain or continuous wave, in reflectance or transmittance configuration.

See also 
 Optical tomography
 Computed tomography laser mammography
 Diffuse optical mammography
 Diffusive optical imaging in neuroscience
 Near-infrared window in biological tissue
 Radiative transfer equation and diffusion theory for photon transport in biological tissue
 Time-domain diffuse optics

References

Medical imaging
Optical imaging